is a passenger railway station in located in the city of Wakayama, Wakayama Prefecture, Japan, operated by West Japan Railway Company (JR West).

Lines

Station layout
The station consists of two opposed side platforms. There is no station building and no connection between the platforms within the station. The station is unattended.

Platforms

Adjacent stations

|-
!colspan=5|West Japan Railway Company (JR West)

History
It was elevated to a full station on April 1, 1955. With the privatization of the Japan National Railways (JNR) on April 1, 1987, the station came under the aegis of the West Japan Railway Company. The current station building was completed in September 2004.

Passenger statistics
In fiscal 2019, the station was used by an average of 1667 passengers daily (boarding passengers only).

Surrounding Area
 Wakayama City Towa Junior High School
 Wakayama City Miyamae Elementary School
 Wakayama Korean Elementary and Intermediate School

See also
List of railway stations in Japan

References

External links

 Miyamae Station Official Site

Railway stations in Wakayama Prefecture
Railway stations in Japan opened in 1955
Wakayama (city)